Wasswa is both a surname and a given name. Notable people with the name include:

 Brian Wasswa, Ugandan activist
 Denis Ssebuggwawo Wasswa (1870–1886), Ugandan Catholic martyr and saint
 Hassan Wasswa (born 1988), Ugandan footballer
 Herman Wasswa (born 1993), Ugandan footballer
 Wasswa Serwanga (born 1976), American football player